Prescott is an unincorporated community in Shelby Township, Shelby County, in the U.S. state of Indiana.

History
Prescott was laid out in 1867 when the railroad was extended to that point.

A post office was established at Prescott in 1860, and remained in operation until it was discontinued in 1905.

Geography

References

Unincorporated communities in Shelby County, Indiana
Unincorporated communities in Indiana